Peru Township may refer to:

 Peru Township, LaSalle County, Illinois
 Peru Township, Miami County, Indiana
 Peru Township, Dubuque County, Iowa, in Dubuque County, Iowa
 Peru Township, Huron County, Ohio
 Peru Township, Morrow County, Ohio

Township name disambiguation pages